Angenor de Oliveira, known as Cartola (Portuguese for top hat), (October 11, 1908 – November 30, 1980) was a Brazilian singer, composer and poet considered to be a major figure in the development of samba.

Cartola composed, alone or with partners, more than 500 songs.

Biography
The third son of Sebastião Joaquim de Oliveira and Aida Gomes de Oliveira, Angenor was born at Rua Ferreira Viana, 74, in the Catete district of Rio de Janeiro.  His parents named him Agenor, but a transcription error on his birth certificate rendered it Angenor, which he learned when he was 55. His nickname was bestowed by friends when he was 15: A construction worker, he always wore a hat—which he called a cartola (top hat)—to protect his hair and clothes.

When Cartola was eight, his family moved to the Laranjeiras neighborhood in Rio; financial difficulties necessitated another move, to Mangueira hill in 1919, where a small favela (an unregulated slum, typically without public services) was beginning to develop. He was forced to work and turn over his pay to his father, with whom he had a troubled relationship. By age 17, he had lost his mother and been kicked out by his father; at 18, he met a woman seven years his senior, Deolinda, who became his wife.

In Mangueira, Cartola soon befriended Carlos Cachaça and other sambistas, getting started in the world of malandragem and samba. In 1928, they founded the Arengueiros Carnival Bloco (street band), which later turned into GRES Estação Primeira de Mangueira, one of the most-loved samba schools in Brazil. Cartola is thought to be responsible for the choice of colors of the school, light green and pink; these were the colors of the rancho do arrepiados in Laranjeiras where, as a boy, he played the cavaquinho (a small guitar, similar to a ukulele), which his father had taught him. (The ranchos were precursors to the samba schools in Rio; they were composed primarily of descendants of slaves, and featured a king and queen in their performing lines).

Cartola became popular in the 1930s, recording many sambas, but prestige didn't translate into financial reward; to support his growing family, he worked as a bricklayer, fishmonger and cheese-seller, and his wife occasionally worked as a cook.

By the late 1940s, things had taken a turn for the worse. At 38, Cartola had a long illness, and shortly after he recovered, his wife died from heart problems. One of his greatest hits, covered by many artists, "Sim (Yes)", was written during his grief. Cartola stopped playing and composing; he moved with his new wife, Donária, into the slum of Manilha, in Nilópolis, where he worked as a handyman.

In 1952, he met and fell in love with Dona Zica, with whom he spent the rest of his life, and who persuaded him to return to music. In 1956, while working as a car-washer in Ipanema, he was rediscovered by the journalist Sérgio Porto, who brought him back to the music world. Porto publicized Cartola's return, inviting him to radio shows and promoting his work with new partners. However, samba's popularity had waned, so he again worked various other jobs.

In 1963, eager to bring the favelas' samba to a broader audience, Cartola—with Zica and Eugênio Agostine—opened the famous Zicartola bar/restaurant in downtown Rio de Janeiro; it became known as the most important samba establishment of that time, providing a link between the traditional sambistas and the incipient Bossa Nova movement. Cartola invited people such as Nélson Cavaquinho, Pixinguinha, Nara Leão, Paulinho da Viola, and Zé Ketti to sing the "low-value" music, as sambistas ironically referred to their work.

Cartola's commercial success started in the late 1960s and early 1970s, when he became quite popular and a lot of samba classics were released, such as "O Sol Nascerá", "O Mundo é Um Moinho", "As Rosas não Falam", "Corra e Olhe o Céu", and "Quem me vê Sorrindo", with support from singers Elizeth Cardoso, Clara Nunes, Paulinho da Viola and especially Beth Carvalho. He released his first record at age 66, in 1974; although he had financial difficulties, he composed and sang until his death, at age 72.

The 2007 documentary film "Música Para os Olhos" directed by Lírio Ferreira and Hilton Lacerda is a profile of the life of Cartola.
 
A biography of Cartola, Divino Cartola – Uma Vida em Verde e Rosa, by Denilson Monteiro, was published in January 2013.

Cartola and Zica appeared briefly in the 1959 film Black Orpheus as a couple at the city hall when the main characters register to get married.

Work

Cartola composed melodies, harmonies, and lyrics. His lyrics are notable for their very correct use of Portuguese, especially considering his lack of formal higher education. His poetry binds in an effective manner elegance and emotion, while keeping a relatively low level of complexity, which made his work accessible to larger layers of the population.

With regard to tempo, Cartola's music had a strong tendency towards calmer, slower sambas in contrast to the faster, brisker sambas de terreiro seen in samba schools and to other composers' music. Some say his sambas had a tendency towards samba-canção. The cavaquinhos in his records had a certain choro mood which was less percussive than usual, with the exception of his last records where Alceu Maia was the cavaquinist.

As a musician, Cartola made use of many modulations, some of which were not common in samba at that time. Some of his modulating tunes are "Quem me vê Sorrindo" and "Sim", "Aconteceu" and "Amor Proibido", "Inverno do Meu Tempo" and "A Cor da Esperança".

Discography

Albums
 1974 – Cartola
 1976 – Cartola II
 1977 – Verde Que Te Quero Rosa
 1978 – Cartola 70 Anos
 1982 – Cartola - Ao Vivo
 1982 – Cartola - Documento Inédito

Contributor
 1942 – "Native Brazilian Music" – Leopold Stokowski
 1967 – "A Enluarada Elizeth" – Elizeth Cardoso ("Seleção de Sambas da Mangueira")
 1968 – "Fala Mangueira!" – Odete Amaral, Cartola, Clementina de Jesus, Nelson Cavaquinho, Carlos Cachaça
 1970 – "História da música popular brasileira" – with Nelson Cavaquinho
 1974 – "História das escolas de samba: Mangueira" -Various
 1975 – "MPB – 100 ao vivo" -Various
 1980 – "E Vamos À Luta" – Alcione ("Eu Sei")
 1993 – "No Tom da Mangueira" – Tom Jobim e Velha Guarda da Mangueira (incluída sua gravação de "Não quero mais amar a ninguém")

Tributes
 1984 – "Cartola, Entre Amigos" – Various
 1987 – "Cartola – 80 Anos" – by Leny Andrade
 1988 – "Cartola – Bate outra vez..."  – Various
 1995 – "Claudia Telles Interpreta Nelson Cavaquinho e Cartola" –  by Claudia Telles
 1998 – "Sambas de Cartola" – Grupo Arranco
 1998 – "Só Cartola" –  by Élton Medeiros and Nelson Sargento
 1998 – "Cartola – 90 Anos" – by Élton Medeiros and Márcia
 2002 – "Cartola" – by Ney Matogrosso
 2003 – "Beth Carvalho canta Cartola" – by Beth Carvalho
 2008 – "Viva Cartola! 100 Anos" – Various

See also
 Afro-Brazilian
 samba

References

External links
Netsaber
JB Online
SóSamba

1908 births
1980 deaths
Brazilian composers
Samba musicians
20th-century Brazilian male singers
20th-century Brazilian singers
20th-century composers
Latin music songwriters